Râul Crucii may refer to the following rivers in Romania:

 Râul Crucii (Brateș) - tributary of the Brateș
 Pârâul Crucii - tributary of the Latorița in Vâlcea County